Glock is a line of pistols manufactured by Glock Ges.m.b.H.
 
Glock may also refer to:

Glock Ges.m.b.H., an Austrian weapons manufacturer
Glock knife
Niersteiner Glöck, Germany's oldest vine denomination

People with the surname
Gaston Glock (born 1929), Austrian weapons designer
Timo Glock (born 1982), Formula One driver
William Glock (1908–2000), British musical administrator

See also

Gloc-9 (born 1977), Filipino rapper
9lokkNine (born 2000), American rapper
G-LOC, G-force induced Loss Of Consciousness
Glockenspiel, a musical instrument
Glocke (disambiguation)